Dwight "D." or "Doc" Watkins (born February 10) is a bestselling author, HBO writer, and lecturer at The University of Baltimore.

Life 
Watkins is a lecturer at the University of Baltimore and New York Times bestselling author from East Baltimore.

Watkins attended Paul Laurence Dunbar High School. At eighteen, after losing his brother and best friend, Watkins began to use and sell narcotics. After a handful of "fateful encounters" he used his illicit profits to buy a bar. Watkins beat addiction, the streets and graduated from Johns Hopkins University who inducted him into its prestigious Society of Scholars and named him a Distinguished Alumnus. He married lawyer Caron Brace in August 2019. In 2020 Watkins won City Lit's Dambach Award for literary service. In 2021 Watkins received the MLA William Wilson Maryland Author Award. Watkins is the writer of Carmelo Anthony’s bestselling memoir Where Tomorrows Aren’t Promised: A memoir of Survival and Hope and staff writer on David Simon's HBO miniseries We Own This City.

Education 
Watkins holds a Masters in Education from Johns Hopkins University, and an MFA in creative writing from University of Baltimore.

Career

The Beastside: Living (and Dying) While Black in America 
Watkins first book, The Beastside: Living (and Dying) While Black in America was published in 2015 under David Talbot and Skyhorse Publishing's investigative book imprint, Hot Books. The Beast Side tells a tale of two Baltimores, taking an in-depth look at systemic racism and the failure of the education system, particularly for black men. In 2016, The Beastside was a Hurston/Wright Legacy Award nominee.

The Cook Up: A Crack Rock Memoir
The Cook Up: A Crack Rock Memoir published in 2016 by Grand Central Publishing, is a memoir that details the operations of a drug empire following Watkins' brother Bip's death, his acceptance to college and the struggle to leave the trade behind. It was named as an editor's pick by The New York Times  in May 2016. Kirkus Reviews described the book as "A familiar story to fans of The Wire, but Watkins provides a gritty, vivid first-person document of a desperate demographic." In 2017, The Cook Up was a Books for a Better Life Award Finalist.

We Speak For Ourselves 
We Speak For Ourselves is Watkins' third book, published in April 2019 by Atria is a collection of essays showcasing black voices in east Baltimore. We Speak For Ourselves was the 2020 selection for the Enoch Pratt Free Library "One Book Baltimore"

Where Tomorrow's Aren't Promised 

Where Tomorrows Aren't Promised was published by Gallery Books in 2021. Watkins teamed up with NBA superstar Carmelo Anthony to document his journey from the gritty streets of Red Hook,Brooklyn and West Baltimore to the NBA. Kirkus writes "Many sports memoirs start with an origin story, but this one is more thought-provoking than one might expect. Kudos to Watkins, who shapes the narrative and rhythm without stepping on Anthony’s voice."

Black Boy Smile: A Memoir in Moments 

Black Boy Smile was published by Legacy Lit and subsidiary of Hachette Books in 2022. Winner of the 2022 Paris Book Award for General Nonfiction, the book details Watkins's journey through the lens of masculinity in combination with his attempt to unlearn harmful toxic traits. Poet Nikki Giovanni praised Black Boy Smile saying “This is a book all young men should read.” Black Boy Smile received starred reviews from both Booklist who named the book as a Top Ten memoir of 2022 and Kirkus who ranked the book amongst the Best Nonfiction Books and Best Books about Black Life released in 2022, called the work “A startling and moving celebration of a brutal life transformed by language and love.”

Black Boy Smile was listed as New York Public Library’s Best Books for Adults in 2022, Shelf Awareness named it one of the best books of the year, and Aspire TV followed by listing the book as one of its Top 5 Celebrity Memoirs of the year.

The Wire: The Complete Visual History 

"The Wire: The Complete Visual History" was published in 2022 by Insight Edition and distributed by Simon and Schuster. "After the success of HBO’s We Own This City, Watkins and The Wire creator David Simon collaborated on a 25 year, 245 page retrospective on what many call, "one of the most brilliant television shows of all time."

Salon 
Watkins is currently an editor at large for the online magazine, Salon.

References

External links 

University of Baltimore faculty
Writers from Baltimore
African-American writers
Living people
1980 births
21st-century African-American people
20th-century African-American people